Bespin is a cloud city planet in the Star Wars universe.

Bespin may also refer to:

 Mozilla Skywriter (formerly Mozilla Bespin), a code editor developed by Mozilla Labs

See also
 Beşpınar (disambiguation)